Beginning in May 1968, a period of civil unrest occurred throughout France, lasting some seven weeks and punctuated by demonstrations, general strikes, and the occupation of universities and factories. At the height of events, which have since become known as May 68, the economy of France came to a halt. The protests reached such a point that political leaders feared civil war or revolution; the national government briefly ceased to function after President Charles de Gaulle secretly fled France to West Germany on the 29th. The protests are sometimes linked to similar movements that occurred around the same time worldwide and inspired a generation of protest art in the form of songs, imaginative graffiti, posters, and slogans.

The unrest began with a series of far-left student occupation protests against capitalism, consumerism, American imperialism and traditional institutions. Heavy police repression of the protesters led France's trade union confederations to call for sympathy strikes, which spread far more quickly than expected to involve 11 million workers, more than 22% of the total population of France at the time. The movement was characterized by spontaneous and decentralized wildcat disposition; this created a contrast and at times even conflict internally amongst the trade unions and the parties of the left. It was the largest general strike ever attempted in France, and the first nationwide wildcat general strike.

The student occupations and general strikes initiated across France were met with forceful confrontation by university administrators and police.  The de Gaulle administration's attempts to quell those strikes by police action only inflamed the situation further, leading to street battles with the police in the Latin Quarter, Paris.

By late May the flow of events had changed. The Grenelle accords, concluded on 27 May between the government, trade unions and employers, won significant wage gains for workers. A counter-demonstration organised by the Gaullist party on 29 May in central Paris gave De Gaulle the confidence to dissolve the National Assembly and call for parliamentary elections for 23 June 1968.  Violence evaporated almost as quickly as it arose.  Workers went back to their jobs, and when the elections were held in June, the Gaullists emerged stronger than before.

The events of May 1968 continue to influence French society. The period is considered a cultural, social and moral turning point in the history of the country. Alain Geismar, who was one of the student leaders at the time, later stated that the movement had succeeded "as a social revolution, not as a political one".

Background

Political climate
In February 1968, the French Communist Party and the French Section of the Workers' International formed an electoral alliance. Communists had long supported Socialist candidates in elections, but in the "February Declaration" the two parties agreed to attempt to form a joint government to replace President Charles de Gaulle and his Gaullist Party.

University demonstration
On 22 March, far-left groups, a small number of prominent poets and musicians, and 150 students occupied an administration building at Paris University at Nanterre and held a meeting in the university council room dealing with class discrimination in French society and the political bureaucracy that controlled the university's funding.  The university's administration called the police, who surrounded the university. After the publication of their wishes, the students left the building without any trouble.  After this first record, some leaders of what was named the "Movement of 22 March" were called together by the disciplinary committee of the university.

Events of May

Student protests

Following months of conflicts between students and authorities at the Nanterre campus of the University of Paris (now Paris Nanterre University), the administration shut down the university on 2 May 1968. Students at the Sorbonne campus of the University of Paris (today Sorbonne University) in Paris met on 3 May to protest against the closure and the threatened expulsion of several students at Nanterre. On Monday, 6 May, the national student union, the Union Nationale des Étudiants de France (UNEF) (translation: the National Union of Students of France) —still the largest student union in France today—and the union of university teachers called a march to protest against the police invasion of the Sorbonne. More than 20,000 students, teachers and supporters marched towards the Sorbonne, still sealed off by the police, who charged, wielding their batons, as soon as the marchers approached. While the crowd dispersed, some began to create barricades out of whatever was at hand, while others threw paving stones, forcing the police to retreat for a time. The police then responded with tear gas and charged the crowd again. Hundreds more students were arrested.

High school student unions spoke in support of the riots on 6 May. The next day, they joined the students, teachers and increasing numbers of young workers who gathered at the Arc de Triomphe to demand that (1) all criminal charges against arrested students be dropped, (2) the police leave the university, and (3) the authorities reopen Nanterre and Sorbonne.

Escalating conflict
Negotiations broke down, and students returned to their campuses after a false report that the government had agreed to reopen them, only to discover the police still occupying the schools. This led to a near revolutionary fervor among the students.

On Friday, 10 May, another huge crowd congregated on the Rive Gauche. When the Compagnies Républicaines de Sécurité again blocked them from crossing the river, the crowd again threw up barricades, which the police then attacked at 2:15 in the morning after negotiations once again floundered. The confrontation, which produced hundreds of arrests and injuries, lasted until dawn of the following day. The events were broadcast on radio as they occurred and the aftermath was shown on television the following day. Allegations were made that the police had participated in the riots, through agents provocateurs, by burning cars and throwing Molotov cocktails.

The government's heavy-handed reaction brought on a wave of sympathy for the strikers. Many of the nation's more mainstream singers and poets joined after the police brutality came to light. American artists also began voicing support of the strikers. The major left union federations, the Confédération Générale du Travail (CGT) and the Force Ouvrière (CGT-FO), called a one-day general strike and demonstration for Monday, 13 May.

Well over a million people marched through Paris on that day; the police stayed largely out of sight. Prime Minister Georges Pompidou personally announced the release of the prisoners and the reopening of the Sorbonne. However, the surge of strikes did not recede. Instead, the protesters became even more active.

When the Sorbonne reopened, students occupied it and declared it an autonomous "people's university". Public opinion at first supported the students, but quickly turned against them after their leaders, invited to appear on national television, "behaved like irresponsible utopianists who wanted to destroy the 'consumer society.'" Nonetheless, in the weeks that followed, approximately 401 popular action committees were set up in Paris and elsewhere to take up grievances against the government and French society, including the Sorbonne Occupation Committee.

Worker strikes

By the middle of May, demonstrations extended to factories, though its workers' demands significantly varied from that of the students. A union-led general strike on 13 May included 200,000 in a march. The strikes spread to all sectors of the French economy, including state-owned jobs, manufacturing and service industries, management, and administration. Across France, students occupied university structures and up to one-third of the country's workforce was on strike.

These strikes were not led by the union movement; on the contrary, the CGT tried to contain this spontaneous outbreak of militancy by channeling it into a struggle for higher wages and other economic demands. Workers put forward a broader, more political and more radical agenda, demanding the ousting of the government and President de Gaulle and attempting, in some cases, to run their factories. When the trade union leadership negotiated a 35% increase in the minimum wage, a 7% wage increase for other workers, and half normal pay for the time on strike with the major employers' associations, the workers occupying their factories refused to return to work and jeered their union leaders. In fact, in the May 68 movement there was a lot of "anti-unionist euphoria," against the mainstream unions, the CGT, FO and CFDT, that were more willing to compromise with the powers that be than enact the will of the base.

On 24 May two people died at the hands of the out of control rioters. In Lyon, Police Inspector Rene Lacroix died when he was crushed by a driverless truck sent careering into police lines by rioters. In Paris, Phillipe Metherion, 26, was stabbed to death during an argument among demonstrators.

As the upheaval reached its apogee in late May, major trade unions met with employers' organizations and the French government to produce the Grenelle agreements, which would increase the minimum wage 35% and all salaries 10%, and granted employee protections and a shortened working day. The unions were forced to reject the agreement, based on opposition from their members, underscoring a disconnect in organizations that claimed to reflect working class interests.

The UNEF student union and CFDT trade union held a rally in the Charléty stadium with about 22,000 attendees. Its range of speakers reflected the divide between student and Communist factions. While the rally was held in the stadium partly for security, the insurrectionary messages of the speakers was dissonant with the relative amenities of the sports venue.

Calls for new government
The Socialists saw an opportunity to act as a compromise between de Gaulle and the Communists. On 28 May, François Mitterrand of the Federation of the Democratic and Socialist Left declared that "there is no more state" and stated that he was ready to form a new government. He had received a surprisingly high 45% of the vote in the 1965 presidential election. On 29 May, Pierre Mendès France also stated that he was ready to form a new government; unlike Mitterrand he was willing to include the Communists. Although the Socialists did not have the Communists' ability to form large street demonstrations, they had more than 20% of the country's support.

De Gaulle flees
On the morning of 29 May, de Gaulle postponed the meeting of the Council of Ministers scheduled for that day and secretly removed his personal papers from Élysée Palace. He told his son-in-law Alain de Boissieu, "I do not want to give them a chance to attack the Élysée. It would be regrettable if blood were shed in my personal defense. I have decided to leave: nobody attacks an empty palace." De Gaulle refused Pompidou's request that he dissolve the National Assembly as he believed that their party, the Gaullists, would lose the resulting election. At 11:00 am, he told Pompidou, "I am the past; you are the future; I embrace you."

The government announced that de Gaulle was going to his country home in Colombey-les-Deux-Églises before returning the next day, and rumors spread that he would prepare his resignation speech there. The presidential helicopter did not arrive in Colombey, however, and de Gaulle had told no one in the government where he was going. For more than six hours the world did not know where the French president was. The canceling of the ministerial meeting, and the president's mysterious disappearance, stunned the French, including Pompidou, who shouted, "He has fled the country!"

Government collapse 
With de Gaulle's closest advisors stating that they did not know what the president intended, Pompidou scheduled a tentative appearance on television at 8 p.m. The national government had effectively ceased to function. Édouard Balladur later wrote that as prime minister, Pompidou "by himself was the whole government" as most officials were "an incoherent group of confabulators" who believed that revolution would soon occur. A friend of the prime minister offered him a weapon, saying, "You will need it"; Pompidou advised him to go home. One official reportedly began burning documents, while another asked an aide how far they could flee by automobile should revolutionaries seize fuel supplies. Withdrawing money from banks became difficult, gasoline for private automobiles was unavailable, and some people tried to obtain private planes or fake national identity cards.

Pompidou unsuccessfully requested that military radar be used to follow de Gaulle's two helicopters, but soon learned that he had gone to the headquarters of the French Forces in Germany, in Baden-Baden, to meet General Jacques Massu. Massu persuaded the discouraged de Gaulle to return to France; now knowing that he had the military's support, de Gaulle rescheduled the meeting of the Council of Ministers for the next day, 30 May, and returned to Colombey by 6:00 pm. His wife Yvonne gave the family jewels to their son and daughter-in-law—who stayed in Baden for a few more days—for safekeeping, however, indicating that the de Gaulles still considered Germany a possible refuge. Massu kept as a state secret de Gaulle's loss of confidence until others disclosed it in 1982; until then most observers believed that his disappearance was intended to remind the French people of what they might lose. Although the disappearance was real and not intended as motivation, it indeed had such an effect on France.

Revolution prevented

On 30 May, 400,000 to 500,000 protesters (many more than the 50,000 the police were expecting) led by the CGT marched through Paris, chanting: "Adieu, de Gaulle!" ("Farewell, de Gaulle!"). Maurice Grimaud, head of the Paris police, played a key role in avoiding revolution by both speaking to and spying on the revolutionaries, and by carefully avoiding the use of force. While Communist leaders later denied that they had planned an armed uprising, and extreme militants only comprised 2% of the populace, they had overestimated de Gaulle's strength as shown by his escape to Germany. One scholar, otherwise skeptical of the French Communists' willingness to maintain democracy after forming a government, has claimed that the "moderate, nonviolent and essentially antirevolutionary" Communists opposed revolution because they sincerely believed that the party must come to power through legal elections, not armed conflict that might provoke harsh repression from political opponents.

Not knowing that the Communists did not intend to seize power, officials prepared to position police forces at the Élysée with orders to shoot if necessary. That it did not also guard Paris City Hall despite reports of that being the Communists' target was evidence of governmental chaos. The Communist movement was largely centered around the Paris metropolitan area, and not elsewhere. Had the rebellion occupied key public buildings in Paris, the government would have had to use force to retake them. The resulting casualties could have incited a revolution, with the military moving from the provinces to retake Paris as in 1871. Minister of Defence Pierre Messmer and Chief of the Defence Staff Michel Fourquet prepared for such an action, and Pompidou had ordered tanks to Issy-les-Moulineaux. While the military was free of revolutionary sentiment, using an army mostly of conscripts the same age as the revolutionaries would have been very dangerous for the government. A survey taken immediately after the crisis found that 20% of Frenchmen would have supported a revolution, 23% would have opposed it, and 57% would have avoided physical participation in the conflict. 33% would have fought a military intervention, while only 5% would have supported it and a majority of the country would have avoided any action.

Election called
At 2:30 p.m. on 30 May, Pompidou persuaded de Gaulle to dissolve the National Assembly and call a new election by threatening to resign. At 4:30 pm, de Gaulle broadcast his own refusal to resign. He announced an election, scheduled for 23 June, and ordered workers to return to work, threatening to institute a state of emergency if they did not. The government had leaked to the media that the army was outside Paris. Immediately after the speech, about 800,000 supporters marched through the Champs-Élysées waving the national flag; the Gaullists had planned the rally for several days, which attracted a crowd of diverse ages, occupations, and politics. The Communists agreed to the election, and the threat of revolution was over.

Aftermath

Protest suppression and elections
From that point, the revolutionary feeling of the students and workers faded away. Workers gradually returned to work or were ousted from their plants by the police. The national student union called off street demonstrations. The government banned a number of leftist organizations. The police retook the Sorbonne on 16 June. Contrary to de Gaulle's fears, his party won the greatest victory in French parliamentary history in the legislative election held in June, taking 353 of 486 seats versus the Communists' 34 and the Socialists' 57. The February Declaration and its promise to include Communists in government likely hurt the Socialists in the election. Their opponents cited the example of the Czechoslovak National Front government of 1945, which led to a Communist takeover of the country in 1948. Socialist voters were divided; in a February 1968 survey a majority had favored allying with the Communists, but 44% believed that Communists would attempt to seize power once in government (30% of Communist voters agreed).

On Bastille Day, there were resurgent street demonstrations in the Latin Quarter, led by socialist students, leftists and communists wearing red arm-bands and anarchists wearing black arm-bands. The Paris police and the Compagnies Républicaines de Sécurité (CRS) harshly responded starting around 10 pm and continuing through the night, on the streets, in police vans, at police stations, and in hospitals where many wounded were taken. There was, as a result, much bloodshed among students and tourists there for the evening's festivities. No charges were filed against police or demonstrators, but the governments of Britain and West Germany filed formal protests, including for the indecent assault of two English schoolgirls by police in a police station.

National feelings
Despite the size of de Gaulle's triumph, it was not a personal one. The post-crisis survey showed that a majority of the country saw de Gaulle as too old, too self-centered, too authoritarian and too conservative. As the April 1969 referendum would show, the country was ready for "Gaullism without de Gaulle".

Legacy

May 1968 is an important reference point in French politics, representing for some the possibility of liberation and for others the dangers of anarchy. For some, May 1968 meant the end of traditional collective action and the beginning of a new era to be dominated mainly by the so-called new social movements.

Someone who took part in or supported this period of unrest is referred to as soixante-huitard (literally a "68-er") — a term, derived from the French for "68", which has also entered the English language.

Slogans and graffiti

  ("Under the paving stones, the beach!"), is a slogan coined by student activist Bernard Cousin, in collaboration with public relations expert Bernard Fritsch. The phrase became a symbol of the events and popular movement during the spring of 1968, when the revolutionary students began to build barricades in the streets of major cities by tearing up street pavement stone. As the first barricades were raised, the students recognized that the stone setts were placed on top of sand. The statement encapsulated the movement's views on urbanization and modern society in both a literal and metaphorical form.

Other examples:
 ("It is forbidden to forbid").
 ("Enjoy without hindrance").
 ("Elections, a trap for idiots").
 CRS = SS.
 . ("I'm a Marxist—of the Groucho persuasion.")
 Also known as "3M".
  ("This concerns all of us.")
 . ("Be realistic, demand the impossible.")
 "When the National Assembly becomes a bourgeois theater, all the bourgeois theaters should be turned into national assemblies." (Written above the entrance of the occupied Odéon Theater)
 "I love you!!! Oh, say it with paving stones!!!"
 "Read Reich and act accordingly!" (University of Frankfurt; similar Reichian slogans were scrawled on the walls of the Sorbonne, and in Berlin students threw copies of Reich's The Mass Psychology of Fascism (1933) at the police).
  ("Workers[,] the fight continues; form a basic committee.") or simply  ("The struggle continues")

In popular culture

Cinema
 The François Truffaut film Baisers volés (1968) (in English: "Stolen Kisses"), takes place in Paris during the time of the riots and while not an overtly political film, there are passing references to and images of the demonstrations.
 The Jean-Luc Godard film Tout Va Bien (1972) examines the continuing class struggle within French society in the aftermath of May 68.
 The Jean Eustache film The Mother and the Whore (1973), winner of the Cannes Grand Prix, references the events of May 1968 and explores the aftermath of the social movement.
 The Claude Chabrol film Nada (1974) is based symbolically on the events of May 1968.
 The Diane Kurys film Cocktail Molotov (1980) tells the story of a group of French friends heading toward Israel when they hear of the May events and decide to return to Paris.
 The Louis Malle film May Fools (1990) is a satiric depiction of the effect of French revolutionary fervor of May 1968 on small-town bourgeoisie.
 The Bernardo Bertolucci film The Dreamers (2003), based on the novel The Holy Innocents by Gilbert Adair, tells the story of an American university student in Paris during the protests.
 The Philippe Garrel film Regular Lovers (2005) is about a group of young people participating in the Latin Quarter of Paris barricades and how they continue their life one year after.
 In the spy-spoof, OSS 117: Lost in Rio, the lead character Hubert ironically chides the hippie students, saying, 'It's 1968. There will be no revolution. Get a haircut.' 
 The Oliver Assayas film Something in the Air (2012) tells the story of a young painter and his friends who bring the revolution to their local school and have to deal with the legal and existential consequences.
 Le Redoutable (2017) – bio-pic of Jean-Luc Godard, covering the 1968 riots/Cannes festival etc.
 CQ a 2001 film set in Paris of 1969, about the making of a science-fiction film, Dragonfly, shows the director discovering his starring actress during 1968 demonstrations.  During Dragonfly, set in the "future" Paris of 2001, the "1968 troubles" are explicitly mentioned.
 The French Dispatch includes a segment, Revisions to a Manifesto, inspired by the protests.

Music
 Many writings of French anarchist singer-songwriter Léo Ferré were inspired by those events. Songs directly related to May 1968 are: "L'Été 68", "Comme une fille" (1969), "Paris je ne t'aime plus" (1970), "La Violence et l'Ennui" (1971), "Il n'y a plus rien" (1973), "La Nostalgie" (1979). 
 Claude Nougaro's song "Paris Mai" (1969).
 The imaginary Italian clerk described by Fabrizio de André in his album Storia di un impiegato, is inspired to build a bomb set to explode in front of the Italian parliament by listening to reports of the May events in France, drawn by the perceived dullness and repetitiveness of his life compared to the revolutionary developments unfolding in France.
 The Refused song entitled "Protest Song '68" is about the May 1968 protests.
 The Stone Roses's song "Bye Bye Badman", from their eponymous album, is about the riots. The album's cover has the tricolore and lemons on the front (which were used to nullify the effects of tear gas).
 The music video for the David Holmes song "I Heard Wonders" is based entirely on the May 1968 protests and alludes to the influence of the Situationist International on the movement.
The Rolling Stones wrote the lyrics to the song "Street Fighting Man" (set to music of an unreleased song they had already written which had different lyrics) in reference to the May 1968 protests from their perspective, living in a "sleepy London town". The melody of the song was inspired by French police car sirens.
Vangelis released an album in France and Greece entitled Fais que ton rêve soit plus long que la nuit ("May you make your dreams longer than the night"), which was about the Paris student riots in 1968.  The album contains sounds from the demonstrations, songs, and a news report.
Ismael Serrano's song "Papá cuéntame otra vez" ("Papa, tell me again") references the May 1968 events: "Papa, tell me once again that beautiful story, of gendarmes and fascists and long-haired students; and sweet urban war in flared trousers, and songs of the Rolling Stones and girls in miniskirts."
 The title of "É Proibido Proibir" by Brazilian singer Caetano Veloso is a Portuguese translation of the aforementioned "It is forbidden to forbid" slogan. It was a protest song against the military regime that assumed power in Brazil in April 1964.
Many of the slogans from the May 1968 riots were included in Luciano Berio's seminal work Sinfonia.
The band Orchid references the events of May 68 as well as Debord in their song "Victory Is Ours".
The 1975's song "Love It If We Made It" makes reference to the Atelier Populaire's book made to support the events, 'Beauty Is in the Street'.

Literature
 The 1971 novel The Merry Month of May by James Jones tells a story of (fictional) American expatriates caught up in Paris during the events.
 The Holy Innocents is a 1988 novel by Gilbert Adair with a climactic finale on the streets of 1968 Paris.  The novel was adapted for the screen as The Dreamers (2003).

Art
The painting May 1968, by Spanish painter Joan Miró, was inspired by the events in May 1968 in France.

See also 

 First Quarter Storm 
 1989 Tiananmen Square protests
 2005 anti-Japanese demonstrations
 2005 civil unrest in France
 2006 youth protests in France
 Anarchism in France
 Autonomism
 Beauty Is in the Street, a 2011 book of posters from May 1968
 Council for Maintaining the Occupations
 Enragés
 On the Poverty of Student Life
 Protests of 1968
 Report on the Construction of Situations
 Situationist International
 Socialisme ou Barbarie
 Sorbonne Occupation Committee
 Taksim Gezi Park protests
 1973 Thai popular uprising, Thailand
 Thammasat University massacre, Thailand
 Black May (1992), Thailand
 2006 Thai coup d'état
 2008 Thai political crisis
 2010 Thai political protests, Thailand
 2014 Thai coup d'état
 2020 Thai protests
 1962 Burmese coup d'état
 1962 Rangoon University protests
 U Thant funeral crisis
 8888 Uprising
 Saffron Revolution
 2020–21 Belarusian protests 
 Yellow Vests Movement
 Sunflower Student Movement, Taiwan
 Strike of ORTF technicians and journalists in May-June 1968

References

Bibliography

Further reading

Abidor, Mitchell. May Made Me. An Oral History of the 1968 Uprising in France (interviews).
Adair, Gilbert. The Holy Innocents (novel).
Bourg, Julian. From Revolution to Ethics: May 1968 and Contemporary French Thought. (2nd ed 2017) excerpt
Casevecchie, Janine. MAI 68 en photos:, Collection Roger-Viollet, Editions du Chene – Hachette Livre, 2008.
Castoriadis, Cornelius with Claude Lefort and Edgar Morin. Mai 1968: la brèche.
Cliff, Tony and Birchall, Ian. France – the struggle goes on. Full text at marxists.org
Cohn-Bendit, Daniel. Obsolete Communism: The Left-Wing Alternative.
Dark Star Collective. Beneath the Paving Stones: Situationists and the Beach, May 68.
DeRoo, Rebecca J. The Museum Establishment and Contemporary Art: The Politics of Artistic Display in France after 1968.
Feenberg, Andrew and Jim Freedman. When Poetry Ruled the Streets.
Ferlinghetti, Lawrence. Love in the Days of Rage (novel).
Gregoire, Roger and Perlman, Fredy. Worker-Student Action Committees: France May '68. PDF of the text
Harman, Chris. The Fire Last Time: 1968 and After. London: Bookmarks, 1988.
Jones, James. The Merry Month of May (novel).
Knabb, Ken. Situationist International Anthology Full text at bopsecrets.org.
Kurlansky, Mark. 1968: The Year That Rocked The World.
 Perreau-Saussine, Emile. "Liquider mai 68?", in Les droites en France (1789–2008), CNRS Editions, 2008, p. 61–68, PDF
Plant, Sadie. The Most Radical Gesture: The Situationist International in a Postmodern Age.

Ross, Kristin. May '68 and its Afterlives.
Schwarz, Peter. '1968: The general strike and the student revolt in France'. 28 May 2008. Retrieved 12 June 1010. World Socialist Web Site.
Seale, Patrick and Maureen McConville. Red Flag/Black Flag: French Revolution 1968.
Seidman, Michael. The Imaginary Revolution: Parisian Students and Workers in 1968 (Berghahn, 2004).
Singer, Daniel. Prelude To Revolution: France In May 1968.
Staricco, Juan Ignacio. The French May and the Shift of Paradigm of Collective Action.
Touraine, Alain. The May Movement: Revolt and Reform.
The Atelier Popularie. Beauty Is in the Street: A Visual Record of the May 68 Uprising.

External links

Archival collections
Guide to the Paris Student Revolt Collection. Special Collections and Archives, The UC Irvine Libraries, Irvine, California.
Paris 1968 Posters Digital Collections | Victoria University Library in the University of Toronto
Paris 1968 Documents Digital Collections | Victoria University Library in the University of Toronto
Paris, Posters of a Revolution Collection Special Collections | Victoria University Library in the University of Toronto
May Events Archive of Documents
Paris May–June 1968 Archive at marxists.org

Others
May 1968: 40 Years Later, City Journal, Spring 2008
Maurice Brinton, Paris May 1968
Chris Reynolds, May 68: A Contested History, Sens Public
Marking the French Social Revolution of 1968, an NPR audio report
Barricades of May ’68 Still Divide the French New York Times

 
France
1968 in France
1968 labor disputes and strikes
1968 riots
Anarchism in France
Far-left politics
Rebellions in France
Trotskyism in France
General strikes in France
History of anarchism
History of socialism
Labor disputes in France
Protests in France
Riots and civil disorder in France
Socialism in France
Student protests in France
Student strikes